Hanani or Chanani is a Hebrew name which means "God has gratified me" or "God is gracious". The name may refer to:

Haim Hanani (1912–1991), Israeli mathematician
Khaled Hanani (born 1978), Algerian athlete
Nidhi Chanani (born 1975), American artist 
Yasmine Hanani (born 1980), American actress
Yehuda Hanani (born 1980), American cellist

See also
Hanani
Hananiah

Hebrew-language surnames
Jewish surnames